Michael Roach (born March 18, 1955, Washington, D.C., United States) is an expatriate American blues performer and educator, who has released six albums on the independent Stella Records label. He conducts workshops on African American musical/cultural heritage internationally, and is a founder of the European Blues Association.

Career
In 1941, Roach's parents moved from South Carolina to Washington, D.C., where the twenty-seven-year-old Roach later heard regional musicians John Jackson, John Cephas and Archie Edwards, who became his mentors in traditional Piedmont blues guitar.

Upon relocating to the UK, Roach became active on the European blues scene,
and founded the European Blues Association (EBA) with writer/historian Dr. Paul Oliver, MBE in 1997. The European Blues Association became a registered charity in 2002, and Roach currently serves as its director.

In 2000, Michael Roach founded "Blues Week", an annual residential program of lectures and instruction in country blues guitar, harmonica, blues piano and vocals at Northampton University (UK).  In 2003, Roach presented Deep Blue, a three part series on blues music featured on BBC Radio 4.  In 2006 he released an instructional DVD, Introduction to Country Blues Guitar.

Roach's tours as an educator and performer have taken him to the Augusta Heritage Center (US), Centrum Piedmont Blues Intensive (US), The Ironworks (UK) and the Smithsonian Institution (US).  He has performed and lectured at blues, jazz, folk and roots music festivals in Croatia, Czech Republic, England, the United States, the United Arab Emirates, and Wales.

Discography
 1993 – Ain't Got Me No Home   (Stella Records)
 1997 – The Blinds of Life   (Stella Records)
 2000 – Good News Blues   (Stella Records)
 2003 – Cypress Grove   (Stella Records)
 2006 – I Betcha !  (Stella Records)
 2010 – Innocent Child   (Stella Records)

References

External links
  Article on Michael Roach, "Back to the Crossroads", January 2009
 Michael Roach homepage
 European Blues Association
 Blues Week/Euroblues site

1955 births
Living people
American blues guitarists
American male guitarists
Piedmont blues musicians
Contemporary blues musicians
20th-century American guitarists
20th-century American male musicians